In 2007, the United States Mint released a gold five-dollar commemorative coin which commemorates the 400th year after the founding of Jamestown. Surcharges from the sale of the Jamestown commemorative were donated to Jamestown-Yorktown Foundation of the Commonwealth of Virginia, the Secretary of the Interior and the Association for the Preservation of Virginia Antiquities to support programs that promote the understanding of the legacies of Jamestown.

The coin was sold as both as a proof coin and an uncirculated coin, with a maximum coinage of 100,000 coins.

Features 

Coin Finishes: proof, and uncirculated

Maximum Mintage: 100,000 - The final mintages were 18,348 uncirculated, and 46,365 proof.

U.S. Mint Facility: West Point Mint (W)

Public Law: 108-289

See also
 
 
 United States commemorative coins
 List of United States commemorative coins and medals (2000s)
 Jamestown 400th Anniversary silver dollar

References 

Modern United States commemorative coins
Currencies introduced in 2007
United States gold coins
Native Americans on coins
Churches in art